The South and Central Men's Club Handball Championship, organized by the South and Central America Handball Confederation, is the official competition for men's handball clubs of South and Central America qualifying the champion of the competition to the IHF Super Globe.
The competition was established in 2019.

Summaries

Medal table

Per Club

Per Nation

References

External links
 Coscabal official website

 
Handball
South and Central America Handball Confederation competitions

Men's sports competitions in South America
Recurring sporting events established in 2019